Aznavour FC, is a defunct Armenian football club from Noyemberyan, Tavush Province.

History
The club was founded in 1981 as Pahatsoyagorts Noyemberyan FC and played their home games at the Noyemberyan Tsentralny Stadium. After the independence of Armenia, the club was renamed Aznavour FC in honour of the French-Armenian singer and composer Charles Aznavour.

However, the club was dissolved in early 1997 due to financial difficulties and is currently inactive from professional football.

League Record

References

Association football clubs established in 1981
Association football clubs disestablished in 1997
Defunct football clubs in Armenia
1981 establishments in Armenia
1997 disestablishments in Armenia